"Stand by Me" is the third single from the second United Kingdom X Factor winner, Shayne Ward. It was released in the UK on 10 July 2006 and is an original track from his debut album, Shayne Ward. The song failed to match the success of his previous singles and charted at number 14 on the UK Singles Chart.

Track listing
 "Stand by Me" (single mix) – 4:24
 "Easy to Love You" – 3:14
 "Hit the Ground Running" – 3:41

Charts

References

Shayne Ward songs
2006 singles
2006 songs
Songs written by Andreas Romdhane
Songs written by Savan Kotecha
Sony BMG singles